Dor-i-Tilavat/Dorut Tilovat/Dor al-Tilavat (House of recitation) is a madrasa in Shahrisabz, Uzbekistan.

Dorut Tilovat was first constructed in the thirteenth century by Shams ud-Din Kulal (not to be confused with his grandson, also named Shams ud-Din Amir Kulal (d. 1370)). He had travelled from Bukhara to Kesh (Shahrisabz) to spread the message of Islam.  Shams ud-Din belonged to a scholarly family. Many noble families sent their sons to study at Dorut Tilavat. One of these famous protégés (murid) was Turghai (d. 1356 AD) – Amir Timur’s father. Turghai held Shams ud-Din in high esteem, and so did his son Timur, who considered Shams ud-Din’s grandson Amir Kulal as his spiritual guide. At his death Shams ud-Din was buried at the madrasa Dorut Tilavat.

Shams ud-Din built a reputation for Dorut Tilavat which continued during the times of his son and grandson, Amir Kulal. After Turghai’s death Timur approached Amir Kulal for his consent to bury Turghai at the side of Shams ud-Din at madrasa Dorut Tilavat. However, the family refused. The lure for Timur was establishing a spiritual connection with a renowned and scholarly family of Bukhara, which also happened to be a direct descendant of the Islamic prophet Muhammad. Amir Kulal, being Timur’s spiritual guide (pir) and head of a strong tribe, yielded considerable influence over Timur and kept him from his intention. However, after Amir Kulal’s death in 1370, the Kulal Tribe lost a strong spiritual leader and Timur, who was in the first year of his reign, chose to go ahead with his plans. He moved his father’s body to Dorut Tilavat. The madrasa and adjacent buildings were expanded and the construction was completed by 1374. In the coming centuries the area was reconstructed and expanded upon numerous times.

Madrasas in Uzbekistan